Child's Special Allowance was a  payment under the United Kingdom system of Social Security.

It was instituted by Harold Macmillan in 1959 for the orphaned children of divorced parents,

It was a contributory non-means tested benefit, paid in addition to child benefit to a divorced woman whose husband had died, whose ex-partner had been paying maintenance and who had not got a new partner. It was not taxable, but was taken into account for meanstested benefits.

It was abolished, as far as new claims were concerned, in April 1987.  At that point it was paid at a rate of £8.05 per eligible child.  Payments continued for existing beneficiaries under the scheme of transitional protection.

References

Social security in the United Kingdom
Child welfare in the United Kingdom
1959 establishments in the United Kingdom
Harold Macmillan